Standard rack can mean:

 19-inch rack as used with electrical and electronic equipment.
 International Standard Payload Rack as used in space stations.
 A standard gauge rack railway 
 A large Rack can also mean the breasts of a lady